Lipovača is a village in Croatia. It is connected by the D2 highway. Administratively, village is part of town of Vukovar, seat of Vukovar-Syrmia County. Bobota Canal passes next to the village. Lipovača forms a western salient of the Town of Vukovar surrounded by the Municipality of Trpinja. The location was originally established as a pustara, a Pannonian type of hamlet.

References

Populated places in Vukovar-Syrmia County
Populated places in Syrmia